Greenwich Hospital may refer to:
 Greenwich Hospital, London, which was a home for retired Royal Navy sailors 1692–1869, operated by the Greenwich Hospital charitable foundation 
 Greenwich District Hospital, a hospital in London from 1970 to 2001
 Memorial Hospital, Woolwich or Greenwich Memorial Hospital, a former general hospital now providing elderly and psychiatric care
 Miller General Hospital, situated in west Greenwich, London
 St Alfege's Hospital, situated in east Greenwich, London (later the site of Greenwich District Hospital)
 Greenwich Hospital (Connecticut), United States
 Greenwich Hospital, Sydney, Australia